Celso Arango is a psychiatrist who has worked as a clinician, researcher, and educator in psychiatry and mental health, notably in the field of child and adolescent psychiatry, psychosis, and mental health promotion.

Biography 
Arango is currently Director of the Gregorio Marañón Psychiatric and Mental Health Institute and Head of the Department of Child and Adolescent Psychiatry at Hospital General Universitario Gregorio Marañón, Professor of Psychiatry at Universidad Complutense of Madrid, Adjunct Professor of Psychiatry at the University of Maryland, a visiting professor of psychiatry at King's College London and Full Adjunt Professor of Psychiatry at University of California, San Francisco.

From 2008 to 2016, he was the Scientific Director of the Spanish Psychiatric Research Network (CIBERSAM). Also in 2008, the Spanish Ministry of Health, Social Services, and Equality awarded him its Medal of Honor, the “Cruz de la Orden Civil de Sanidad.
Between 2012 and 2014, he was the Fundación Alicia Koplowitz Endowed Chair for Child Psychiatry at the Universidad Complutense of Madrid, and he has been a board member  of the European Brain Council (the European Commission's advisory body) since 2013. In December 2014, he was appointed chairman of the National Commission for the Child and Adolescent Psychiatry Specialty by the Ministry of Health, Social Services and Equality. Recently he was awarded by the American College of Psychiatrists with the Dean Award, by The International College of Neuropsychopharmacology with the CINP Sumitomo/Sunovion Brain Health Clinical Research Award and has been appointed as member of the The Royal Academy of Medicine.

Arango is a past president of the European College of Neuropsychopharmacology. In 2022, he was appointed as president of the Spanish Psychiatry Society  and member of The Royal Academy of Medicine of Spain. He has written numerous articles that have been published in journals such as Nature, Nature Neuroscience, Nature Medicine, Nature Genetics, JAMA Psychiatry, Lancet Psychiatry, World Psychiatry, and American Journal of Psychiatry, and is included in the Top 2% Scientists ranking of Stanford University and in the Highly Cited Researchers 2022.

Selected publications 

Arango has written more than 650 peer-reviewed articles, including:
Arango et al. Safety and efficacy of agomelatine in children and adolescents with major depressive disorder receiving psychosocial counselling: a double-blind, randomised, controlled, phase 3 trial in nine countries. Lancet Psychiatry. 2022 Feb;9(2):113-124.
Andreu-Bernabeu et al. Polygenic contribution to the relationship of loneliness and social isolation with schizophrenia. Nature Communications. 2022 Jan 10;13(1):51.
Mantua et al. Digital health technologies in clinical trials for central nervous system drugs: an EU regulatory perspective. Nature Reviews Drug Discovery. 2021 Feb;20(2):83-84.
Davies et al. Using common genetic variation to examine phenotypic expression and risk prediction in 22q11.2 deletion syndrome. Nature Medicine. 2020 Dec;26(12):1912-1918.
Guloksuz et al. Examining the independent and joint effects of molecular genetic liability and environmental exposures in schizophrenia: results from the EUGEI study. World Psychiatry. 2019 Jun;18(2):173-182.
Jongsma et al. Treated Incidence of Psychotic Disorders in the Multinational EU-GEI Study. JAMA Psychiatry. 2018 Jan 1;75(1):36-46.
Lim et al. Rates, distribution and implications of postzygotic mosaic mutations in autism spectrum disorder. Nature Neuroscience. 2017 Sep;20(9):1217-1224.
Galling et al. Type 2 Diabetes Mellitus in Youth Exposed to Antipsychotics: A Systematic Review and Meta-analysis. JAMA Psychiatry. 2016 Mar;73(3):247-59.
Vorstman JA, et al. Deletion Syndrome. Cognitive Decline Preceding the Onset of Psychosis in Patients with 22q11.2 Deletion Syndrome. JAMA Psychiatry. 2015 Apr;72(4):377-85.
Steinberg S, et al. Common variant at 16p11.2 conferring risk of psychosis. Molecular Psychiatry. 2014 Jan;19(1):108-14.
Arango C. Child neuropsychopharmacology: good news… the glass is half full. World Psychiatry. 2013 Jun;12(2):128-9.
Arango C et al. Progressive brain changes in children and adolescents with first-episode psychosis. JAMA Psychiatry. 2012 Jan; 69(1):16-26.
Steinberg S et al. Common Variants at VRK2 and TCF4 Conferring Risk of Schizophrenia. Hum Mol Genet. 2011 Oct; 20(20):4076-81.
Arango C et al. Lessons learned about poor insight. Schizophr Bull. 2011 Jan; 37(1):27-8.
Arango C. Attenuated psychotic symptoms syndrome: how it may affect child and adolescent psychiatry. Eur Child Adolesc Psychiatry. 2011 Feb; 20(2): 67-70.

References

Year of birth missing (living people)
Living people
Spanish psychiatrists
University of Oviedo alumni
Complutense University of Madrid alumni
Alumni of the University of Manchester